is a 2009 Japanese drama film directed by Shinichi Mishiro.

Cast
Takako Tokiwa as Mao Kubota
Kento Hayashi
Tomoko Nakajima
Nozomu Iwao
Terunosuke Takezai
Nako Mizusawa
Teruhiko Saigō
Masato Hagiwara
Kōsuke Toyohara
Tsurutaro Kataoka (special appearance)
Shirō Itō (special appearance)
Kaoru Yachigusa
Tatsuya Nakadai

References

External links
Official website

Japanese drama films
2009 drama films
2009 films
2000s Japanese films